Bob Falkenburg and Jack Kramer were the defending champions, but Kramer was ineligible to compete after turning professional at the end of the 1947 season. Falkenburg partnered with Frank Parker, but lost to John Bromwich and Frank Sedgman in the semifinals.

Bromwich and Sedgman defeated Tom Brown and Gardnar Mulloy in the final, 5–7, 7–5, 7–5, 9–7 to win the gentlemen's doubles tennis title at the 1948 Wimbledon Championship.

Seeds

  Bob Falkenburg /  Frank Parker (semifinals)
  Tom Brown /  Gardnar Mulloy (final)
  John Bromwich /  Frank Sedgman (champions)
  Tony Mottram /  Eric Sturgess (quarterfinals)

Draw

Finals

Top half

Section 1

Section 2

Bottom half

Section 3

Section 4

References

External links

Men's Doubles
Wimbledon Championship by year – Men's doubles